Reassessing the Nuremberg Military Tribunals. Transitional Justice, Trial Narratives, and Historiography is a book published in 2012 by Berghahn Books; it was edited by Kim Priemel and Alexa Stiller.

References

2012 non-fiction books
Books about legal history
Berghahn Books books
Nuremberg trials